Shyamala Chechi is a 1965 Indian Malayalam film directed by P. Bhaskaran and produced by R. Chella Durai and V. Abdulla. The film stars Sathyan, Ambika, Sukumari and Adoor Bhasi. The film has a musical score by K. Raghavan.

Cast

Sathyan
Ambika
Sukumari
Adoor Bhasi
Pappukutty Bhagavathar
T. R. Omana
T. S. Muthaiah
Bahadoor
Kottarakkara Sreedharan Nair
Pariyanampatta
Premji
T. Damodaran

Soundtrack
The music was composed by K. Raghavan and the lyrics were written by Thunchathezhuthachan and P. Bhaskaran.

References

External links
 

1965 films
1960s Malayalam-language films
Films directed by P. Bhaskaran